Dandikoppa is a village in Dharwad district of Karnataka, India.

Demographics
As of the 2011 Census of India there were 168 households in Dandikoppa and a total population of 937 consisting of 473 males and 464 females. There were 119 children ages 0-6.

References

Villages in Dharwad district